Metroplex is the third studio album by American singer Lutricia McNeal. It was first released by Bonnier Music on 18 November 2002 in Sweden.

Background
Much of Metroplex was recorded recorded in Los Angeles, London, and Sundsvall, with the bulk of the set being produced by duo Fresh & Sweet at Sidelake Studios.

Critical reception

laut.de editor Alexander Engelen rated Metroplex three out of five stars and described it as "danceable feelgood pop/R&B."

Track listing

Charts

Release history

References

2002 albums
Lutricia McNeal albums